Jewish Luck is a 1925 Soviet black and white silent film directed by Alexis Granowsky.

Plot 
Menahem-Mendl, with the goal of making money, opens an insurance company, and he involved in the street haberdashery trade, but all is unsuccessful. Suddenly he learns the names of rich brides and designs to become a shadkhn (matchmaker).

Starring 
 Solomon Mikhoels as Menahem-Mendl
 Moisei Goldblat as Zalman
 Tamara Adelgeym as Belya Kimbach	
 A. Epstein
 I. Rogaler

References

External links 
 

1925 films
1920s Russian-language films
Soviet black-and-white films
Soviet silent feature films